Fan Changsheng (范長生 fàn chángshēng) (died 318) was a Taoist priest and leader who was instrumental in the establishment of the Cheng Han state during the Sixteen Kingdoms era in China. He led a Taoist community of over one thousand families on Mount Qingcheng, Sichuan. During a critical famine, Fan Changsheng provided Li Xiong's army with food from his community's bounty. With Fan's help, Li Xiong achieved victory over Luo Shang's army during Li Xiong's siege of Chengdu.

After Li Xiong's victory, he offered Fan the throne. Fan declined, claiming that the year 304 would be an auspicious date (jiazi) for someone from the Li family to take the throne. Fan Changsheng then served as the Chancellor of Cheng Han under Li Xiong. Fan later helped to persuade Li Xiong to take the title of emperor. After Fan's death, his son Fan Ben succeeded him as the Chancellor of Cheng Han.

Fan was the author of the lost work, Shucai (蜀才), a ten volume commentary on the I Ching. He was later considered to be one of the Eight Immortals from Sichuan.

References
 Kleeman, Terry F., Great Perfection: Religion and Ethnicity in a Chinese Millennial Kingdom, 

318 deaths
Cheng Han Taoists
Jin dynasty (266–420) Taoists
Taoist religious leaders
Year of birth unknown
Taoist immortals